Nina Kether Axelrod (born July 28, 1955) is an American actress who appeared in films and television mainly during the late 1970s through the early 1980s. Since the early 1990s, she has worked as a casting director on films and taught drama in schools.

Biography 
Several of her family members have worked in the film industry. She is married to Robert Jaffe, an actor, writer, and producer, and mother of actor Taliesin Jaffe. She is the daughter of Joan Stanton and George Axelrod, who was a screenwriter, producer, playwright and film director. Her siblings are lawyer Peter Axelrod and author Steven Axelrod.

Career 
Her television appearances have included Charlie's Angels and CHiPs. Her noted films include Roller Boogie (1979), the now cult classic, slasher parody Motel Hell (1980), Time Walker (1982), Cross Country (1983) and Critters 3 (1991). In the mid 80s, Axelrod began her present work in film casting. In 1981, Axelrod read for the Rachael character of Ridley Scott's science fiction noir, Blade Runner (1982) and is featured on a screen test of the 2007 DVD release of the Final Cut release, Disc 4 of "Blade Runner".

References

External links
 
 

1955 births
20th-century American actresses
Living people
Actresses from New York City
American film actresses
American television actresses
21st-century American women